Ari Huumonen (March 5, 1956 – May 20, 2013) was a discus thrower from Finland, best known for finishing in fourth place at the inaugural 1983 World Championships. He won the Finnish national championship in the discus three times (1983, 1985 and 1987).

References

External links

1983 Year Ranking

1956 births
2013 deaths
Finnish male discus throwers
Place of birth missing
20th-century Finnish people
21st-century Finnish people